El Bagour (  ) is a small city in northern Egypt. It is located in the Nile Delta in the Monufia Governorate. El Bagour has 48 surrounding villages.

Location 
El Bagour is located in the eastern part of Monufia Governorate, has borders with Benha to the east - 13 km, Menouf to the west - 15 km, Shibin El Kom to the north - 12 km and Ashmoun to the south - 20 km

Climate 
Köppen-Geiger climate classification system classifies its climate as hot desert (BWh).

Population 
According to 2006 census, Population reached 304,420 citizens ( Main city and surrounding villages ).
Main city's population is about 50,000 citizens.

Gallery

See also

 List of cities and towns in Egypt

References

Populated places in Monufia Governorate